Doina Ivănescu (January 22, 1935 – 1996) was a professional volleyball player in Romania.  In 1964, she went to the Olympics and helped Romania capture fourth place. She was born in Blaj, in Alba County, Romania. She was married to Traian Ivănescu a former international footballer and coach.

References

1935 births
1996 deaths
Romanian women's volleyball players
Olympic volleyball players of Romania
Volleyball players at the 1964 Summer Olympics
People from Blaj
20th-century Romanian women